Leoncia Maria Martin, known professionally as Leoncie, is an Indian–Icelandic musician. Her other stage names are Icy Spicy Leoncie and Indian Princess Leoncie.

Life 
Leoncie was born in Goa in India. She is of Indian and Portuguese descent (Goa was a Portuguese Colony until 1961). She studied music at Trinity College Of Music London. In 1982 she moved to Kópavogur, Iceland after marrying an Icelander, where she worked as an entertainer.

A singer-songwriter, she has been compared to Madonna and the Peruvian entertainer Tigresa del Oriente. In 2003, Morgunblaðið called her "one of the most unusual and controversial artists in the country." Icelandic musician  said in 2015 "It is difficult to explain or describe Leoncie, or her cultural significance to foreigners. Perhaps she could be described as an un-ironic Icelandic/Indian version of Ru Paul?" In 2016, journalist  called her "the enfant terrible of Icelandic outsider music." She has appeared on the British shows The X Factor and Eurotrash.

Discography 

 My Icelandic Man (1985)
 Story from Brooklyn (1992)
 Love Message from Overseas (2001 or 2003)
 Sexy Loverboy (2002)
 Invisible Girl (2005)
 Radio Rapist-Wrestler (2005)
 Pukki Bollywood Baby (2008)
 Wild American Sheriff (2009)
 Dansaðu við Leoncie (2011)
 Gay World (2012)
 Mr. Lusty (2017)

References

External links 
 Official YouTube channel
 
 Musician/Wrestler/Soul Toucher, Iceland Review 2009, archived

20th-century Icelandic women singers
Living people
People from Goa
21st-century Icelandic women singers
Year of birth missing (living people)
Icelandic women singer-songwriters